Clark Middle School can refer to:

Clark Middle School (Texas), a middle school in the United Independent School District of Laredo, Texas
Clark Middle School (Texas), a middle school in the Frisco Independent School District
Clark Middle School (California), a middle school in the San Diego Unified School District